Dasharatham is a 1989 Indian Malayalam-language drama film written by A. K. Lohithadas and directed by Sibi Malayil. It stars Mohanlal, Rekha, Murali, Nedumudi Venu, Sukumaran, Karamana Janardanan Nair,  Sukumari, Kaviyoor Ponnamma, K. P. A. C. Lalitha, and Jayabharathi. The music was composed by Johnson. The movie deals with the subject of traditional surrogacy

Dasharatham is widely regarded as one of the best films from the writer-director duo Lohithadas-Sibi Malayil. Lohithadas won the Kerala Film Critics Award for Best Scriptwriter. Dasharatham was the first Malayalam film officially dubbed and released in Marathi as Mazaa Mulga (Meaning: My son).

Plot

Rajiv Menon is born into riches and is an alcoholic with absolutely no aim in life. With no parents to guide him and with the family business being run by a trusted manager Pillai, Rajiv is free to waste his life and money on drinks and debauchery. A close friend Scariah with his wife and children come over to stay at Rajiv's palatial house for a week. Soon Rajiv gets attached to one of Scariah's children and decides that he wants to have a child of his own, but neither does he want to get married nor does he want to adopt a baby.

One of his good friends, guide and philosopher Dr. Hameed, advises Rajiv to find a surrogate for artificial insemination. They come across a former football player Chandradas who is in dire need of money for an operation, his wife Annie agrees to give birth to Rajiv's child through traditional surrogacy. Both Chandradas and Annie aren't happy about the decision – it's clearly a desperate solution to their financial needs.

At first Annie just wants to get over with the 9-month pregnancy period, hand over the baby and move on with life. The usually rash and immature Rajiv is now a changed man, reading up books on pregnancy, childbirth and making sure that Annie stays in an atmosphere that is cheerful, beautiful and is taken care of by nurses, provided with the best diet and so on to ensure the birth of a healthy and happy baby. He is completely taken up by the thought of having a child, the thought of finally having someone he can call his own. But by the time of the child's birth, and also being its biological mother, Annie gets emotionally attached to the life that is taking shape in her womb and refuses to part with the baby and starts to become extremely selfish.

Finally Rajiv hands over the child to Annie very reluctantly. In the climax, Rajiv asks the maid Maggie, whether every mother has an attachment to her child like Annie has. Rajiv asks Maggie if she can love him as if she would her own son. Maggie is dumbfounded while Rajiv walks off emotionally distraught and in tears without waiting for an answer.

Cast

 Mohanlal as Rajiv Menon
 Rekha as Annie
 Murali as Chandradas, Annie's husband
 Nedumudi Venu as Scariah
 Sukumaran as Dr. Hameed
 Karamana Janardanan Nair as Manager Pillai
 Sukumari as Maggie
 Kaviyoor Ponnamma as Chandradas's mother
 Jayabharathi as Dr. Zeenath
 K. P. A. C. Lalitha as Mariyamma
 M. S. Thripunithura as Adv. Govindan
 Kollam Thulasi as Advocate Santhosh Menon
 Jagannathan as Sankaran Nair
 Vineeth Kumar as Joseph
 Bobby Kottarakkara as Babu, office staff
 Ajay Mathias as Baby

Soundtrack

References

External links
 
 Dasharatham at OneIndia
 All Time Favorites Dasharatham

1989 films
Films directed by Sibi Malayil
Films with screenplays by A. K. Lohithadas
Indian drama films
Films about surrogacy
1980s Malayalam-language films
Indian pregnancy films